Elois is a given name. Notable people with the name include:

 Elois Grooms (born 1953), American football player
 Elois Jenssen (1922–2004), American film and television costume designer
 Elois Rabuffetti Baier (born 1985), Argentinian/Italian dulce de leche maker

See also
 Eloise (given name)
 Lois